Little Fictions is the seventh studio album by English rock band Elbow, released on 3 February 2017 on Polydor Records and Concord Records. Produced by pianist and keyboardist Craig Potter, the album is the band's first without founding drummer Richard Jupp, who had departed from the band the previous year.

The album was preceded by the singles, "Magnificent (She Says)", "All Disco" and "Gentle Storm", and features collaborations with The Hallé Orchestra and their choir.

Singles
The lead single from the album, "Magnificent (She Says)", was released on 6 December 2016. The second single, "All Disco", was released on 5 January 2017, and was inspired by American musician Black Francis of the band Pixies. The third single, "Gentle Storm", was released on 27 January 2017. The music video for the song, directed by Kevin Godley, was released alongside the single. The video was inspired by the song "Cry" by Godley & Creme, and featured English actor Benedict Cumberbatch alongside the band members and some family and friends.

Reception

Little Fictions was well-received from music critics upon its release. At Metacritic, which assigns a normalized rating out of 100 to reviews from mainstream critics, the album has received an average score of 80 based on 19 reviews, indicating "generally favourable reviews". Many reviews credited the changes the band made on the album, mainly pointing towards the more 'soulful' sound they had achieved.

In the review for AllMusic, editor Stephen Thomas Erlewine wrote that "By moving forward steadily, encompassing a changing present -- both in musical and personal terms -- Elbow wind up with a mature, resonant record. Little Fictions feels quietly hopeful, making it a tonic for troubled times." In the review for The Guardian, Dave Simpson described the album as having "Songs are built around loops or percussive pianos; electric guitar motifs replace strummed acoustics and Garvey is audibly a man in love, although the results are more uplifting than gooey." In the write-up for Slant Magazine, Josh Hurst declared that "Little Fictions, then, might be called the quietest of Elbow albums, as it’s the tamest and most ballad-heavy. It might just as easily be christened their most intimate, their most casual, and their most soulful. All of these superlatives are relative, of course; the album grows in stature and appeal with every spin, and distinguishes itself as an Elbow album not quite like any other."

Amongst the other positively-received reviews of the album, Alan Ashton-Smith from MusicOMH stated that "It might just as easily be christened their most intimate, their most casual, and their most soulful. All of these superlatives are relative, of course; the album grows in stature and appeal with every spin, and distinguishes itself as an Elbow album not quite like any other." With similar levels of praise, Under the Radar magazine's Scott Dransfield called the album "epic" and that it "seem[ed] designed to mimic techno and other electronic forms via organic instruments," while concluding overall that "compositionally Elbow sounds more refreshed than they have since The Seldom Seen Kid, and hopefully Little Fictions is a signal of the beginning of a new creative phase." Concluding their review for Pretty Much Amazing, Landon MacDonald declared that "Little Fictions is another solid entry in the Elbow catalog that is destined to be mostly ignored. The band peaked almost a decade ago, but still churns out surprisingly deep, solid records every couple of years. If you are still reading this, you probably are a fan and maybe even wish they were more on top of the world like Coldplay or something, know that I agree and its really all disco anyway."

Track listing

Accolades

Credits

Elbow
Guy Garvey – lead vocals, guitar
 Craig Potter – keyboard, piano, backing vocals, producer
 Mark Potter – guitar, backing vocals
 Pete Turner – bass guitar, backing vocals

Additional musicians

 Alex Reeves – drums percussion
 The Halle Orchestra, the Halle Ancoats Community Choir, members of London Contemporary Voices

Charts

Weekly charts

Year-end charts

References

2017 albums
Elbow (band) albums
Polydor Records albums
Concord Records albums